Nooksack Cirque is in North Cascades National Park in the U.S. state of Washington, on the eastern slopes of Mount Shuksan. Nooksack Cirque was formed by glaciers and the East Nooksack Glacier is located in the cirque below the headwall known as Jagged Ridge. Nooksack Cirque streams and meltwater from the East Nooksack Glacier form the headwaters for the Nooksack River.

References

Landforms of Whatcom County, Washington
North Cascades National Park
Cirques of the United States